Asfarjan may refer to:
 Asfarjan, Ardabil
 Asfarjan Rural District, in Isfahan Province